Baikunthanath Swain (13 January 1935 – 2 October 1995) was an Odia politician. He was elected to the 8th and 11th Odisha Legislative Assembly from Kakatpur Assembly constituency in 1980 and 1995.

Early life 
Swain was born to Achutananda Swain on 13 January 1935. His wife's name was Kadambini Swain.

Political career 
He was active in Odisha politics as a member of Indian National Congress and elected twice to Odisha Legislative Assembly.

Death 
He died on 2 October 1995 at 60.

References 

1935 births
1995 deaths
People from Puri district
Odisha MLAs 1980–1985
Odisha MLAs 1995–2000
Indian National Congress politicians from Odisha